Barakani is a small town on the island of Anjouan in the Comoros. According to the 1991 census the town had a population of 3,787. The current estimate for 2009 is 6,665 people.

References

Populated places in Anjouan